Femmes Fatales is an independent women's professional wrestling promotion based in Montreal, Quebec, Canada. In September 2009, NCW hosted their first edition of NCW Femmes Fatales which regrouped many fighting females in North America. NCW Femmes Fatales was announced in April 2010 to be part of the Female Fight League during the 45th Edition of the Cauliflower Alley Club Reunion in Las Vegas. In November 2009, they gave an homage to Maurice Vachon and Paul Vachon as part of a documentary tracing back Mad Dog's career.

Championships

Roster

The following roster is correct as of Femmes Fatales 23.

Wrestlers
 Alexia Nicole - Femmes Fatales Champion
 Ashley Vox
 Ava Everett
 Cecil Nyx
 Davienne
 Ivelisse
 K. C. Spinelli
 Kimber Lee
 LuFisto
 Meave O’Farrell
 Neveah
 Nicole Savoy
 Sally
 Veda Scott

Events

References

External links 
 
 

Canadian professional wrestling promotions
Women's professional wrestling promotions
2009 establishments in Quebec
Professional wrestling in Montreal